Meet Me in St. Gallen is a 2018 Filipino romantic comedy-drama film written and directed by Irene Emma Villamor, starring Carlo Aquino and Bela Padilla. In the story, Celeste (Padilla) and Jesse (Aquino) have a one-night stand and then go their separate ways, only to end up meeting again in St. Gallen, Switzerland. The film was released February 7, 2018, in theaters nationwide.

Synopsis
Celeste (Bela Padilla) assumes the name "Katy Perry" whenever she hangs out at coffee shops. She then meets Jesse (Carlo Aquino) and the two realize that their names are similar to those of the  American romantic-comedy-drama film Celeste and Jesse Forever. Consequently, their time spent together ends up on a one-night stand and, although they go their separate ways afterward, they would reunite a couple of years later where they agreed to see each other, St. Gallen.

Cast
Carlo Aquino as Jesse Abaya
Bela Padilla as Celeste Francisco
Nonie Buencamino as Jesse's father
Kat Galang as Celeste's friend

Angelica Panganiban also made her in-photo cameo appearance as Diana.

Production
Irene Villamor, the writer and director of Meet Me in St. Gallen, developed the idea for the film. After writing the script, Villamor sent it to Carlo Aquino who, although was initially reluctant to play Jesse, eventually took over as he felt it delivered a fresh vision on the romantic-comedy genre. Bela Padilla, whose previous collaboration with Villamor was in Camp Sawi, was cast as Aquino's girlfriend Celeste. Aquino's and Padilla's casting was officially announced mid-October 2017. Principal photography in St. Gallen began mid-December 2017 and lasted four days. A sex scene between Aquino and Padilla was filmed on a single take.

Reception

Box office
The film earned PHP 3 million on its first day of showing. The production company of the film announced via their Instagram website that the film earned an estimated PHP 55 million last February 18, 2018. The film grossed an estimated PHP 75 million.

See also
Kita Kita
Celeste and Jesse Forever

References

External links

2018 films
2018 romantic comedy-drama films
Films shot in Switzerland
Films set in Switzerland
Philippine romantic comedy-drama films
Spring Films films
Viva Films films
Films directed by Irene Emma Villamor